Corrigan is a town in north central Polk County, Texas. It is located along U.S. Highway 59 and is about 100 miles from Houston.  Its population was 1,477 in the 2020 census.

Background

Corrigan largely emerged when the Houston East and West Texas Railway was completed in 1881; though, the area had seen some establishment of mills and farms prior to the railroad. The town was named Corrigan after Pat Corrigan, the conductor of the first train to pass through the newly built railway in the area. In the years following, the timber industry boomed in Corrigan due to the large pine trees native to the area and access to the railroad. By 1882, there were 17 sawmills in the Corrigan area. The timber industry lead to churches, stores, hotels, gins, and other businesses opening in Corrigan. In 1883, a post office opened. The Corrigan economy began to diversify, which helped the community survive economic downturns that happened periodically in the timber industry. However, the timber industry remained at the core of the Corrigan economy and shaped many of the towns social structures.

In 2000, there were 114 businesses in Corrigan. An analysis by the Houston Chronicle of Texas traffic stop data found the Corrigan Police Department to be among the most aggressive at enforcing traffic laws in the state, with the towns 12 police officers issuing over 8,100 citation in 2020.

Geography

Corrigan is located at  (30.998281, –94.826690).

Demographics

As of the 2020 United States census, there were 1,477 people, 677 households, and 444 families residing in the town.

As of the census of 2000,  1,721 people, 630 households, and 437 families were residing in the town. The estimated population in 2018 was 1,604. The population density was 934.9 people/sq mi (361.1/km2). The 734 housing units averaged 398.7/sq mi (154.0/km2). 
The racial makeup of the town was 48.11% White, 42.18% African American, 0.23% Native American, 8.83% from other races, and 0.64% from two or more races. Hispanics or Latinos of any race were 14.93% of the population.

Households
Of the 630 households, 37.6% had children under 18 living with them, 40.3% were married couples living together, 24.6% had a female householder with no husband present, and 30.6% were not families. About 28.1% of all households were made up of individuals, and 15.6% had someone living alone who was 65 or older. The average household size was 2.63, and the average family size was 3.23.

In the town, the age distribution was 31.3% under 18, 10.9% from 18 to 24, 23.4% from 25 to 44, 18.1% from 45 to 64, and 16.3% who were 65 or older. The median age was 32 years. For every 100 females, there were 84.5 males. For every 100 females age 18 and over, there were 73.7 males.

Income
The median income for a household in the town was $18,980, and for a family was $24,830. Males had a median income of $30,144 versus $19,881 for females. The per capita income for the town was $10,794. About 30.3% of families and 31.5% of the population were below the poverty line, including 42.1% of those under age 18 and 30.8% of those age 65 or over.

Education
The Town of Corrigan is served by the Corrigan-Camden Independent School District, which operates Corrigan-Camden High School.

The Texas Legislature designated Polk County as being in the boundary of Angelina College's district.

Climate
The climate in this area is characterized by hot, humid summers and generally mild to cool winters.  According to the Köppen climate classification, Corrigan has a humid subtropical climate, Cfa on climate maps.

References

Towns in Polk County, Texas
Towns in Texas